The Frog Lake Massacre was part of the Cree uprising during the North-West Rebellion in western Canada. Led by Wandering Spirit, young Cree men attacked officials, clergy and settlers in the small settlement of Frog Lake in the District of Saskatchewan in the North-West Territories on 2 April 1885. Nine settlers were killed in the incident.

Causes 
Chief Big Bear and his band had settled near Frog Lake about 55 km (34 miles) northwest of Fort Pitt but had not yet selected a reserve site. He had signed Treaty 6 in 1882. Angered by what is an unfair treaty and by the dwindling buffalo population and the subsequent enforced starvation of the Cree people, Big Bear began organizing the Cree for resistance.

Learning of the Métis victory at the Battle of Duck Lake a week earlier and of Poundmaker's advance on Battleford, Wandering Spirit, the war chief of Big Bear's band, began a campaign to gather arms, ammunition and food supplies from the surrounding countryside. The only source of supplies and the first to be looted were the government stables, the Hudson's Bay Company post and George Dill's store at Frog Lake. Anger among the Cree in the area was directed largely at the representative of the Canadian government, the Indian agent Thomas Quinn, who was the source of the inadequate rations that kept the Cree in a state of near-starvation.

Massacre 

A band of Cree led by the war chief Wandering Spirit took Thomas Quinn hostage in his home in the early morning of 2 April. The Cree then took more white settlers hostage and took control of the community. They gathered the Europeans, including two priests, in the local Catholic church, where Mass was in progress. After Mass concluded, at around 11:00 a.m., the Cree ordered the prisoners to move to their encampment a couple of kilometres away.

Quinn steadfastly refused to leave the town; in response, Wandering Spirit shot him in the head. In the resulting panic, despite Big Bear's attempt to stop the shootings, Wandering Spirit's band killed another eight unarmed settlers: the two Catholic priests, Leon Fafard and Felix Marchand, Fafard's lay assistant John Williscroft, as well as John Gowanlock, John Delaney, William Gilchrist, George Dill, and Charles Gouin.

A Hudson's Bay Company clerk, William Bleasdell Cameron, one of the men rounded up into the church, went to the Hudson's Bay shop to fill an order made by Quinn for Miserable Man after Mass.  When the first shots were fired, he escaped with the help of sympathetic Cree, and made his way to a nearby Wood Cree camp, where the chief protected him.

Theresa Gowanlock and Theresa Delaney, wives of two of the slain men, their families, and approximately seventy others from the town were taken captive.
They gathered the white settlers in the settlement into the local church. Thomas Quinn, the town's Indian Agent, was killed after a disagreement broke out. The Cree then shot most of the settlers. Nine people were killed, and three settlers (two widows, Teresa Delaney and Teresa Gowanlock, and a young man, William Cameron) were taken as captives as well as several Metis, including John Pritchard, Pierre Blondin, Dolphus Nolin, and Louis Goulet. These men "purchased" the two widows and put them under Pritchard's protection.

The two Teresa's later wrote a book on their experience - Two Months in the Camp of Big Bear. William Cameron's book Blood Red the Sun was also a popular piece of first-hand history writing.

The incident, along with the Metis rebellion at the same time, prompted the Canadian government to send troops and police to the area. The rebellion was eventually put down, and Wandering Spirit, the war chief responsible for the Frog Lake incident, was captured.

After the massacre, the bodies of Fafard, Marchand, Delaney and Gowanlock had been hurriedly placed in the cellar under the church by several of the Métis residents who were now captive. At great risk, they also moved the bodies of Quinn and Gouin into the cellar of a house near where they were killed. However, they were refused permission to touch the other victims.

The church, the rectory and all the buildings of the Frog Lake settlement were burned on April 4, 1885 (the day before Easter). All that remained of the mission was the bell tower and the cemetery.

On June 14 the Midland Battalion (the advance guard of Major-General Strange) arrived and buried the victims of the massacre in the cemetery. During their occupation the bell, which was suspended from the fire blackened bell tower, disappeared.

Aftermath 
The Cree moved on to Fort Pitt.  The massacre prompted the Canadian government to send troops and police to the area. The rebellion was put down.

Wandering Spirit, (Kapapamahchakwew) a Plains Cree war chief, Little Bear (Apaschiskoos), Walking the Sky (A.K.A. Round the Sky), Bad Arrow, Miserable Man, Iron Body, Ika (A.K.A. Crooked Leg) and Man Without Blood were put on trial for murders committed during the Frog Lake Massacre and at Battleford (the murders of Farm instructor Payne and Battleford farmer Barney Tremont). None of the accused natives were allowed legal counsel, and Judge Charles Rouleau sentenced each of them to death by hanging. He sentenced three others to hang as well, but their death sentences were commuted.

Minister of Justice John Sparrow David Thompson reviewed the cases but mitigating circumstances were not taken into account, and in retrospect, justice seems to have been arbitrarily dispensed.

Eight Natives, including Wandering Spirit, were hanged on Nov. 27, 1885, in the largest mass hanging in Canada's history.

Although Big Bear had opposed the attack, he was charged with treason because of his efforts to organize resistance among the Cree.  He was convicted and sentenced to three years in the Manitoba Penitentiary.

Legacy
Frog Lake became part of the province of Alberta in 1905. The site of the massacre was designated the "Frog Lake National Historic Site" in 1923, at the location of the Cree uprising which occurred in the District of Saskatchewan, North-West Territories. Parks Canada says the site designated by the Historic Sites and Monuments Board of Canada is extensive, but the national park service owns only a small portion, mainly a graveyard, where a stone cairn and federal plaque were erected in 1924. The geographic coordinates on this page are for that cairn.

In 2008, Christine Tell (provincial minister for tourism, parks, culture and sport) said "the 125th commemoration, in 2010, of the 1885 Northwest Resistance is an excellent opportunity to tell the story of the prairie Métis and First Nations peoples' struggle with Government forces and how it has shaped Canada today."

See also
Bell of Frog Lake
List of massacres in Canada
List of conflicts in Canada

References

Further reading
 This work was published in three editions 1926–1930, and a revised edition was published in 1950 as 
 Though a novel, a highly accurate account of the massacre and aftermath. First ed. 1984

External links
University of Alberta Libraries
Article
Frog Lake National Historic Site, official site
 ; Wandering Spirit Bio
Northwest Campaign

Massacres in 1885
Battles of the North-West Rebellion
Cree
Massacres by First Nations
Aboriginal National Historic Sites of Canada
National Historic Sites in Alberta
April 1885 events
Massacres in Canada